Trogoderma is a genus of beetles in the family Dermestidae, the skin beetles. There are about 135 species worldwide.

Some species are serious pests of stored animal and plant products.

Species include:
 Trogoderma adelaideum Blackburn, 1891
 Trogoderma albonotatum Reiche, 1868
 Trogoderma alpicorum Blackburn, 1891
 Trogoderma americanum Dejean, 1837
 Trogoderma angustum Solier, 1849
 Trogoderma antennale Broun, 1893
 Trogoderma anthrenoides Sharp, 1902
 Trogoderma antipodum Blackburn, 1891
 Trogoderma apicale MacLeay, 1871
 Trogoderma apicipenne Reitter, 1881
 Trogoderma arcanum Zhantiev, 2002
 Trogoderma armstrongi Háva, 2003
 Trogoderma asperatum Fauvel, 1903
 Trogoderma atrum Philippi & Philippi, 1864
 Trogoderma attagenoides Pascoe, 1866
 Trogoderma bactrianum Zhantiev, 1970
 Trogoderma baeri Pic, 1915
 Trogoderma ballfinchae Beal, 1954
 Trogoderma beali Mroczkowski, 1968
 Trogoderma bicinctum Reitter, 1881
 Trogoderma blackburni Lea, 1908
 Trogoderma boganense Armstrong, 1942
 Trogoderma caboverdianum Kalík, 1986
 Trogoderma callubriense Armstrong, 1945
 Trogoderma carteri Armstrong, 1942
 Trogoderma cavum Beal, 1982
 Trogoderma celatum Sharp, 1902
 Trogoderma consors Arrow, 1915
 Trogoderma davidsoni Háva & Kadej, 2006
 Trogoderma debilius Blackburn, 1903
 Trogoderma denticorne Normand, 1936
 Trogoderma deserti Beal, 1954
 Trogoderma difficile Blackburn, 1891
 Trogoderma dominicanum Háva & Kadej, 2006
 Trogoderma ellipticum Armstrong, 1942
 Trogoderma explanaticolle Armstrong, 1942
 Trogoderma exsul Blackburn, 1903
 Trogoderma eyrense Blackburn, 1891
 Trogoderma fantasticum Háva & Kadej, 2006
 Trogoderma fasciferum Blatchley, 1914
 Trogoderma frater Arrow, 1915
 Trogoderma froggatti Blackburn, 1892
 Trogoderma glabrum Herbst, 1783
 Trogoderma granarium Everts, 1898 – Khapra beetle
 Trogoderma granulatum Broun, 1886
 Trogoderma grassmani Beal, 1954
 Trogoderma halsteadi Veer & Rao, 1994
 Trogoderma hobartense Armstrong, 1942
 Trogoderma impressiceps Pic, 1915
 Trogoderma inclusum LeConte, 1854
 Trogoderma inconspicuum Armstrong, 1942
 Trogoderma insulare Chevrolat, 1863
 Trogoderma irroratum Reitter, 1881
 Trogoderma kaliki Háva, 2006
 Trogoderma koenigi Pic, 1954
 Trogoderma laevipenne Armstrong, 1942
 Trogoderma larvale Háva, Prokop & Herrmann, 2006
 Trogoderma leai Armstrong, 1942
 Trogoderma lindense Blackburn, 1891
 Trogoderma longisetosum Chao & Lee, 1966
 Trogoderma longius Blackburn, 1903
 Trogoderma macleayi Blackburn, 1891
 Trogoderma madecassum Pic, 1924
 Trogoderma maderae Beal, 1954
 Trogoderma maestum Broun, 1880
 Trogoderma marginicolle Armstrong, 1942
 Trogoderma mauricepici Háva, 2003
 Trogoderma maurulum Blackburn, 1903
 Trogoderma megatomoides Reitter, 1881
 Trogoderma melanarium Sturm, 1843
 Trogoderma mexicanum Reitter, 1881
 Trogoderma meyricki Blackburn, 1891
 Trogoderma mongolicum Zhantiev, 1973
 Trogoderma morio Erichson, 1842
 Trogoderma nigrobrunneum Armstrong, 1942
 Trogoderma nigronitidum Armstrong, 1945
 Trogoderma nitens Arrow, 1915
 Trogoderma obscurum Pic, 1936
 Trogoderma occidentale Blackburn, 1891
 Trogoderma octaedron Peyerimhoff, 1943
 Trogoderma okumurai Beal, 1964
 Trogoderma ornatum Say, 1825
 Trogoderma paralia Beal, 1954
 Trogoderma parvum Armstrong, 1942
 Trogoderma pectinicornis Reitter, 1881
 Trogoderma peruvianum Pic, 1954
 Trogoderma picinum Armstrong, 1945
 Trogoderma plagifer Casey, 1916
 Trogoderma primum Jayne, 1882
 Trogoderma punctatum Broun, 1886
 Trogoderma puncticolle Broun, 1914
 Trogoderma quadrifasciatum Broun, 1893
 Trogoderma reitteri Blackburn, 1892
 Trogoderma rubiginosum Solier, 1849
 Trogoderma ruficolle Reitter, 1881
 Trogoderma rufipenne Armstrong, 1942
 Trogoderma rufonotatum Pic, 1942
 Trogoderma rufopictum Arrow, 1915
 Trogoderma schawalleri Háva, 2007
 Trogoderma schmorli Reitter, 1881
 Trogoderma seminigrum Pic, 1915
 Trogoderma serraticorne Fabricius, 1792
 Trogoderma serratum Dejean, 1837
 Trogoderma serrigerum Sharp, 1877
 Trogoderma setulosum Armstrong, 1942
 Trogoderma signatum Sharp, 1877
 Trogoderma silvicolum Armstrong, 1949
 Trogoderma simplex Jayne, 1882
 Trogoderma sinense Pic, 1927
 Trogoderma singulare Blackburn, 1891
 Trogoderma sinistrum Fall, 1926
 Trogoderma socium Lea, 1895
 Trogoderma stachi Mroczkowski, 1958
 Trogoderma sternale Jayne, 1882
 Trogoderma subfascia (Dahl, 1823)
 Trogoderma subrotundatum Reitter, 1881
 Trogoderma subtile Reitter, 1881
 Trogoderma tasmanicum Armstrong, 1942
 Trogoderma tenuefasciatum Reitter, 1881
 Trogoderma teukton Beal, 1956
 Trogoderma thoracicum Reitter, 1881
 Trogoderma tolarnense Blackburn, 1903
 Trogoderma unifasciatum Pic, 1942
 Trogoderma variabile Ballion, 1878
 Trogoderma variegatum Solier, 1849
 Trogoderma varipes Blackburn, 1892
 Trogoderma varium Matsumura & Yokoyama, 1928
 Trogoderma versicolor Creutzer, 1799
 Trogoderma vicinum Dejean, 1837
 Trogoderma villosum Dejean, 1821
 Trogoderma vulneratum Fauvel, 1903
 Trogoderma westerduijni Háva & Herrmann, 2007
 Trogoderma whitei Armstrong, 1942
 Trogoderma yorkense Blackburn, 1891
 Trogoderma yunnaeunse Zhang & Liu, 1986

References

Dermestidae